Steven David Old (born 17 February 1986) is a New Zealand footballer who plays as a defender for East Kilbride in the Lowland League.

Club career
He was released from A-League club Wellington Phoenix at the end of the 2007/08 season. He formerly played for the Newcastle United Jets where he covered for Craig Deans who was in the USA. Prior to joining the Jets, Old attended St. John's University (NY) and played two years of football there.

Old was training with Scottish Premier League club Kilmarnock since 22 January 2009, awaiting his work permit to sign for that team.  On 30 March 2009 he signed a three-year contract with Kilmarnock, after receiving his permission to play.

In the final weeks of 2010, Old had a loan spell at Cowdenbeath in which he made 4 appearances. Following his loan spell at Cowdenbeath, Old struggled to make a first team appearance under manager Mixu Paatelainen and Kenny Shiels. In May 2011, Old was released by the club.

In July 2011 Old went on pre-season tour to South Africa with Perth Glory with a view of getting a contract with the A-League club.

On 13 February 2012 Old joined Conference South club Basingstoke Town on noncontract terms after he had been training with them for a couple of months. Old made his debut the next day in a 2–2 draw against Salisbury City.

Old joined Conference South club Sutton United in October 2012 and made his debut in the 1–0 home victory against Chelmsford City

On 28 February 2013, Steven Old signed for China League One side Shijiazhuang Yongchang Junhao on transfer deadline day in China, replacing Vlado Jeknić who injured a week before.

With Shijiazhuang, Old's side unsuccessfully faced 2013 Chinese Super League runners-up Shandong Luneng but on the whole had a successful mid-table season following the club's relocation from Fujian. Old scored in the final game of the season against Yanbian White Tigers.

On 13 November 2015 he signed up for the Swedish club GAIS. After 1 goal in 33 league appearances he left the club in the summer 2017.

On 27 July 2017, Old joined English Football League 2 side Morecambe Football Club on a one-year deal, subject to international clearance. Steven will wear the number 5 shirt.

On 2 July 2020, it was announced that Old had left Morecambe having turned down the offer of a further one year contract in order to return to Scotland to be closer to his family.

Lowland League club East Kilbride announced the signing of Old on 24 July 2020.

International career
Old captained New Zealand in the Under 17's, as well as being a part of the Under 20s and Under 23's, before progressing to the New Zealand national team, making his debut in a 2006 FIFA World Cup qualification match against Australia on 29 May 2004. Old scored his first international goal on 19 February 2006, in a 1–0 New Zealand victory against Malaysia in Christchurch.

He was included in the New Zealand squad for the football tournament at the Summer Olympics in Beijing. He played in 2 of New Zealands 3 group matches against China (1–1) and Belgium (0–1). Old missed the 5–0 loss to Brazil after serving a one-game suspension for receiving a red card in their first game against China. Old was named as part of the 2009 FIFA Confederations Cup New Zealand squad.

Old was called up to the New Zealand squad to play Mexico on 3 March 2010 as an injury-replacement player for captain Ryan Nelsen.

References

External links
 
 
 Steven Old at Basingstoke
 

1986 births
Living people
A-League Men players
Kilmarnock F.C. players
New Zealand expatriate association footballers
New Zealand international footballers
New Zealand association footballers
Newcastle Jets FC players
Olympic association footballers of New Zealand
Sportspeople from Palmerston North
Wellington Phoenix FC players
Scottish Premier League players
People educated at Palmerston North Boys' High School
Cowdenbeath F.C. players
Cangzhou Mighty Lions F.C. players
Ljungskile SK players
GAIS players
Morecambe F.C. players
Scottish Football League players
China League One players
Superettan players
Expatriate footballers in China
Expatriate footballers in Sweden
Expatriate footballers in Scotland
New Zealand expatriate sportspeople in China
New Zealand expatriate sportspeople in Sweden
New Zealand expatriate sportspeople in Scotland
New Zealand expatriate sportspeople in England
2004 OFC Nations Cup players
2008 OFC Nations Cup players
Footballers at the 2008 Summer Olympics
2009 FIFA Confederations Cup players
Association football defenders
English Football League players
East Kilbride F.C. players
Lowland Football League players